Hector Riské (29 July 1910 – 21 December 1984) was a Belgian wrestler. He competed in the men's freestyle featherweight at the 1936 Summer Olympics.

References

External links
 

1910 births
1984 deaths
Belgian male sport wrestlers
Olympic wrestlers of Belgium
Wrestlers at the 1936 Summer Olympics
People from Temse
Sportspeople from East Flanders